The 1912 Triangular Tournament was a Test cricket competition played between Australia, England and South Africa, the only Test-playing nations at the time.

The ultimate winners of the tournament were England, with four wins in their six matches, but the tournament was deemed a failure, with disappointing crowds and uncompetitive cricket, caused in part by a weakened Australia team.

The tournament was the first tournament in Test history to be played between more than two nations. It was the only such tournament until the Asian Test Championships of 1998–99 and 2001–02, and the ICC World Test Championship which began in 2019.

Background 

The idea of a competition involving all three of the nations then playing Test cricket (Australia, England and South Africa) was proposed at the first meeting of the Imperial Cricket Council in July, 1909.  The original proposal was for a tournament to be held every four years, with the first hosted by England in 1912.

For a variety of reasons, the tournament was not a success. The summer was one of the wettest since records began in 1766: rainfall in the three months of June, July and August was more than twice the annual average, and August, 1912, was the coldest, dullest and wettest August of the 20th century.  At that time, pitches were not covered to protect them against rain, so the batsmen were at a distinct disadvantage on the proverbial sticky wicket. These problems were exacerbated since Tests in England were in those days played over three days rather than the five days that is now usual.  Two of the matches between England and Australia were drawn due to the weather, with the final match being played on a pitch said to be "better suited to water polo".

In addition, disputes between the players and management in Australia meant that six leading Australian players refused to tour (including the captain, Clem Hill, and Victor Trumper, neither of whom played for Australia again), weakening a side that had otherwise been level with England in recent Ashes series.  The leg spin and googly bowlers in the South African side were very effective on the matting pitches then in use in South Africa, but were less threatening on English grass pitches.  As a result, England dominated, winning four of their six matches and drawing the other two.

Finally, the British public showed little interest:  in the words of The Daily Telegraph:  "Nine Tests provide a surfeit of cricket, and contests between Australia and South Africa are not a great attraction to the British public."

The tournament was so unsuccessful that it has never been repeated. The idea of a tournament of international cricket matches between more than two countries was not repeated, outside of regional tournaments in East Africa and the West Indies, until the invention of One Day International cricket and the first Cricket World Cup in 1975. The only other Test cricket tournaments in history were the Asian Test Championships played in 1998–99 and 2001–02, which were also not great successes, until the ICC World Test Championship began in 2019.

Squad

England
C. B. Fry (captain)
Jack Hobbs
Wilfred Rhodes
Reginald Spooner
Frank Woolley
Johnny Douglas
Jack Hearne
Pelham Warner
Frank Foster
Schofield Haigh
Tiger Smith
Sydney Barnes
Gilbert Jessop
Harry Dean
Ernie Hayes
Bill Hitch
Walter Brearley

Australia
Syd Gregory (captain)
Warren Bardsley
Barlow Carkeek
Sid Emery
Gerry Hazlitt
Claude Jennings
Charles Kelleway
John McLaren
Charlie Macartney
Jimmy Matthews
Edgar Mayne
Roy Minnett
David Smith
Harold Webster
Bill Whitty

South Africa
Frank Mitchell (captain)
Louis Tancred (captain)
Rolland Beaumont
Tom Campbell
Claude Carter
Joe Cox
Aubrey Faulkner
Gerald Hartigan
Charles Llewellyn
Dave Nourse
Sid Pegler
Reggie Schwarz
Sibley Snooke
Louis Stricker
Herbie Taylor
Tommy Ward
Gordon White

Notable incidents 

Perhaps the most notable incident of the series was Australian bowler Jimmy Matthews taking two hat-tricks in the same Test match, one in each innings of the opening match against South Africa, the only time a bowler has taken two hat-tricks in the same Test.

Tests

First match: Australia v South Africa at Old Trafford, 27–28 May 1912

 Report
 Australia batted first, completing their first innings score of 448 on the first day, with centuries for Charles Kelleway and Warren Bardsley. Sid Pegler took 6 wickets for 105 runs. South Africa were 16 for 1 at the close.
 South Africa were bowled out for 265 on the second day (with a century for Aubrey Faulkner, and Bill Whitty taking 5 wickets for 55 runs).  They were within 30 runs of saving the follow on when Jimmy Matthews took a hat-trick to dismiss the last three batsmen.  183 runs behind, the South Africans were asked to bat again, and were bowled out again on the same day for 95 (Kelleway taking 5 for 33).  Matthews took a second hat-trick in the second innings.
 Australian bowler Jimmy Matthews took a double hat-trick, one in each of South Africa's innings, both hat-tricks being taken on the same day, 28 May 1912.  Matthews took no other wickets in the match. 
 South Africa's debutant wicket-keeper Tommy Ward was Matthews' 3rd victim in both innings.  Ward's is the only known instance of a king pair on debut in Test cricket.

Second match: England v South Africa at Lord's, 10–12 Jun 1912

 Report
 For the first time in a Test match, extras top scored in an innings.
 Heavy rain in the week before the match delayed the start on the first day until after 3pm, and then batting conditions were treacherous.  South Africa were all out for 58 in their first innings within 90 minutes.  Frank Foster and Sydney Barnes bowled 26.1 overs unchanged, taking 5 wickets each.  England's opening batsmen Jack Hobbs and Wilfred Rhodes found the conditions much easier to cope with, and England were 122 for 1 at the close.
 On a sunny second day, Reggie Spooner scored 119, and Frank Woolley 73, with Pegler taking 7 for 65.  England were all out for 337, with a first innings lead of 279 runs.  South Africa were 114 for 4 at the close.
 South Africa were bowled out for 217 on the third day, with Charlie Llewellyn scoring 75 and Barnes taking another 6 wickets.

Third match: England v Australia at Lord's, 24–26 Jun 1912

 Report
 The match was ruined by the weather.  Only about 3 hours were played on the first day due to two interruptions for rain.  Play was not too difficult on the wet pitch to begin with, but became treacherous as the pitch dried.  At the close, England were on 211/4.  England added 30 runs in 20 minutes on the second day.
 The third day was sunny, and England declared at 310 for 7 (Hobbs 107).  
 In reply, Australia made 282 for 7 before rain ended play, playing defensively to avoid defeat. Charlie Macartney scored 99 runs before being caught out, becoming only the third player in Test cricket to be dismissed one run short of a century.

Fourth match: England v South Africa at Headingley, 8–10 Jul 1912

 Report
 England were bowled out for 242 in their first innings (Woolley 57; Dave Nourse 4/52) before the end of the first day's play, and South Africa were 141/8 at the close.
 South Africa were all out for 147 on the second day (Pegler 35; Barnes 6/52), and England added 238 in their second innings (Spooner 82; Aubrey Faulkner 4/50).
 Having set South Africa a target of 334 to win, they reached 105/7 at the close of the second day's play, and were bowled out again for 159 on the third day (Louis Tancred 39, Barnes 4/63).

Fifth match: Australia v South Africa at Lord's, 15–17 Jul 1912

 Report
 South Africa were bowled out for 263 on the first day (Herbie Taylor 93; Bill Whitty 4/68), and Australia were 88/2 at the close.
 Australia reached 390 all out on the second day, 127 runs ahead, with centuries for Kelleway and Warren Bardsley (his 164 being the highest score in the tournament) and four wickets for Pegler.  South Africa were 146/8 at the close.
 After bowling South Africa out for 173 on the third day (Llewellyn 59; Matthews 4/29), setting a target of 47 to win.  Claude Jennings and debutant Ernie Mayne reached 48 runs for no loss within half an hour, to win the match.

Sixth match: England v Australia at Old Trafford, 29–31 Jul 1912

 Report
 In a rain affected match, play started at nearly 3pm on the first day, and around 5pm on the second day.  With less than 110 overs possible over three days, England reached 185/6 at the end of the first day, and were all out for 203 (Wilf Rhodes 92; Gerry Hazlitt 4/77 and Bill Whitty 4/43) on the second day.
 Australia reached 14 for no loss before no further play was possible on the remainder of the second day or on the third day, and the match was drawn.

Seventh match: Australia v South Africa at Trent Bridge, 5–7 Aug 1912

 Report
 Despite a sodden pitch, cloudy weather allowed South Africa to reach 266/8 at the end of the first day.  They were dismissed for 329 (Nourse 64), and the second day closed with Australia all out for 219 (Bardsley 56, Pegler 4/80).   No play was possible on the third day.

Eighth match: England v South Africa at The Oval, 12–13 Aug 1912

 Report
 In a low-scoring match, South Africa were bowled out for 95, with five wickets each for Barnes and Woolley.  England reached 176 and then bowled South Africa out again for 93 (Barnes bowling unchanged to take 8/29), setting England a target of 13 runs to win.  Jack Hobbs and Young Jack Hearne took only 27 balls to score 14 for no loss before lunch on the second day, to win by 10 wickets.

Ninth match: England v Australia at The Oval, 19–22 Aug 1912

 Report
 The tournament rules did not anticipate that two teams could complete their matches with the same number of wins and therefore contained no tie-breaking conditions. Therefore, to ensure an overall winner, the match was played as a timeless Test, with the 3-day time limit removed.  Regardless, the match finished during the fourth day.
 Despite heavy rain the day before the match, England reached 223/8 on the first day.  There was only  hours play on the second day due to rain, during which England were dismissed for 245, with half centuries for Jack Hobbs and Frank Woolley and four wickets each for Bill Whitty and Roy Minnett.  Australia were 51/2 when play was abandoned for the day.
 Australia were dismissed for 111 on the third day, with five wickets each for Barnes and Woolley and only Kelleway and Bardsley reaching double figures.  The last 7 wickets fell for 21 runs  England lost two quick wickets after lunch but batting became easier after a further rain delay and England were 64/4 at the close, 198 runs ahead.
 England were dismissed on the fourth day for 175 in their second innings, with CB Fry scoring 79 and Gerry Hazlitt taking 7/25. Needing 310 to win the match and the tournament, Australia were dismissed for just 65, with again only two batsmen reaching double figures (opener Claude Jennings and number 3 Charles Macartney), Woolley taking 5/20 and Harry Dean 4/19.

Results table

See also
Big Six cricket dispute of 1912

References

Further reading
 H S Altham, A History of Cricket, Volume 1 (to 1914), George Allen & Unwin, 1962
 Derek Birley, A Social History of English Cricket, Aurum, 1999
 Rowland Bowen, Cricket: A History of its Growth and Development, Eyre & Spottiswoode, 1970
 Bill Frindall, The Wisden Book of Test Cricket 1877–1978, Wisden, 1979
 David Frith, The Golden Age of Cricket 1890–1914, Lutterworth, 1978
 Chris Harte, A History of Australian Cricket, Andre Deutsch, 1993
 various writers, A Century of South Africa in Test & International Cricket 1889–1989, Ball, 1989
 Roy Webber, The Playfair Book of Cricket Records, Playfair Books, 1951
 Wisden Cricketers' Almanack 1913
 Patrick Ferriday Before the Lights Went Out – The 1912 Triangular Tournament Von Krumm Publishing 2011

External links
 CricketArchive re Australian tour
 Cricket Archive re South African tour
 The original damp squib (from Cricinfo)
 Report of the tournament from 334notout.com

Tri
Tri
Tri
Tri
English cricket seasons in the 20th century
Tri
International cricket competitions in England
Tri
1912
Triangular Tournament
Triangular Tournament
Triangular Tournament
Triangular Tournament
Triangular Tournament